is a railway station in the city of Seki, Gifu Prefecture, Japan, operated by the third sector railway operator Nagaragawa Railway.

Lines

Station layout
Seki-Shimouchi Station has one ground-level side platform serving a single bi-directional track. The station is unattended.

Adjacent stations

|-
!colspan=5|Nagaragawa Railway

History
Seki-Shimouchi Station was opened on December 11, 1986 as  It was renamed to its present name on April 1, 2006.

Surrounding area
Gifu Prefectural Sekiuchi High School

See also
 List of Railway Stations in Japan

References

External links

 

Railway stations in Japan opened in 1986
Railway stations in Gifu Prefecture
Stations of Nagaragawa Railway
Seki, Gifu